Johnny Cunningham (27 August 1957 – 15 December 2003) was a Scottish folk musician and composer, instrumental in spreading interest in traditional Celtic music.

Johnny Cunningham was born on 27 August 1957 in Portobello, Edinburgh. He was raised as a member of the Church of Jesus Christ of Latter-day Saints, but later became inactive.

He was a founding member of Silly Wizard, as well as a member of Relativity, The Raindogs, and Nightnoise. Throughout his career, Cunningham was a fiddler, composer, and producer. His younger brother, Phil Cunningham, also a former member of Silly Wizard, is a multi-instrumentalist best known for his piano-accordion and whistle playing. Johnny Cunningham died of a heart attack on 15 December 2003 in New York City at the age of 46.

Discography
 Thoughts from Another World (1981)
 Fair Warning (1983)

With Phil Cunningham
 Against the Storm (1980)

With Silly Wizard
 Silly Wizard (1976)
 Caledonia's Hardy Sons (1978)
 So Many Partings (1979)
 Live in America (1985)
 Golden Golden (1985)
 A Glint of Silver (1986)
 Live Wizardry (1988)

With Relativity
 Relativity (1986)
 Gathering Place (1987)

With Nightnoise
 Shadow of Time (1993)
 A Different Shore (1995)
 The White Horse Sessions (1997)

With Celtic Fiddle Festival
 Celtic Fiddle Festival (1993)
 Celtic Fiddle Festival: Encore (1998)
 Rendezvous (2001)

With Susan McKeown
 Peter & Wendy (1997), also with Seamus Egan, Karen Kandel and Jamshied Sharifi
 A Winter Talisman (2001)
 Sweet Liberty (2004)

With Thomas Moore (spiritual writer)
 The Soul of Christmas (1997), also with Seamus Egan, Kathy Mattea, Susan McKeown, Cathie Ryan and Jamshied Sharifi

With The Raindogs
 Lost Souls (1990)
 Border Drive-In Theatre (1991)

With others
 To Warm the Winter's Night, with Áine Minogue (1995)
 ‘’Love and Loss’’, with Steve Payne (1999)
 Live on 11th Street, with Casey Neill Band (2003)

Composer
In the 1990s Johnny worked with the New York-based theater company Mabou Mines on a theatrical production, "Peter & Wendy". He composed music and lyrics for this musical adaptation of J.M. Barrie's play "Peter Pan," which won two OBIE Awards. The soundtrack album from this innovative production was recorded and released nationally in 1997. Productions of "Peter & Wendy" have been presented and revived numerous times.

References

External links
 Official Johnny Cunningham website's "In Memoriam"
 Kennedy Center videotapes of Johnny Cunningham performances
 Celtic Cafe tribute
 Scotsman.com obituary
 World Music Central bio
https://www.maboumines.org/production/peter-and-wendy/

1957 births
2003 deaths
People from Portobello, Edinburgh
Scottish fiddlers
British male violinists
Scottish folk musicians
British record producers
20th-century violinists
20th-century Scottish musicians
Silly Wizard members
The Raindogs members
Relativity (band) members
Nightnoise members
20th-century British male musicians
Green Linnet Records artists
Musicians from Edinburgh